Toygar Işıklı (born 16 April 1974) is a Turkish film score composer, music producer and singer.

Life 
He graduated from Gölcük Barbaros Hayrettin High School. He then moved to Istanbul and took his undergraduate major programme of vocal studies in Marmara University. He received his MA degree in composition master programme from Istanbul Technical University MIAM (Center for Advanced Studies in Music). Currently, he is having his postgraduate degree on musicology and music theory at Istanbul Technical University. Toygar Işıklı also studied film scoring in Berklee College of Music. Throughout his education he had the chance to collaborate with renowned composers and academicians such as Hasan Uçarsu, Kamran İnce, Pieter Snapper, David Osbon, Şehvar Beşiroğlu and Nail Yavuzoğlu for his research and work on jazz, 20th century music, classical Turkish music and classical Western music.

He was a member of Objektif in 2007, in their 5th album, Sokağın Sesi.

Film scores

TV series soundtracks

Other works

Awards

Discography 
Çukur-Platinum Edition ( Soundtrack 2020, Arven Records )
Babil ( Tv Series Soundtrack 2020, Arven Records )
 ( Soundtrack 2019, Arven Records )
Çarpışma ( Tv Series Soundtrack 2019, Arven Records )
Çukur-Season 1&2&3 ( Soundtrack 2019, Arven Records )
Şahin Tepesi ( Tv Series Soundtrack 2019, Arven Records )
Bizim İçin Şampiyon ( Original Fim Score 2019, Arven Records )
Çukur-Live ( Soundtrack 2018, Arven Records )
Can Feda ( Original Fim Score 2018, Arven Records )
İçerde-Deluxe Edition ( Tv Series Soundtrack 2018, Arven Records )
8. Gün ( Tv SeriesSoundtrack 2018, Arven Records )
Acı Tatlı Ekşi ( Original Fim Score 2018, Arven Records )
The Guest ( Original Fim Score 2019, Arven Records )
Kaybedenler Kulübü Yolda ( Original Fim Score 2018 )
Martıların Efendisi ( Original Fim Score 2018)
İçerde - Live ( Soundtrack 2017, Arven Records )
Cesur ve Güzel ( Tv Series Soundtrack 2017, Arven Records )
Bu Şehir Arkandan Gelecek ( Tv Series Soundtrack 2017, Arven Records )
Sonsuz Aşk ( Original Fim Score 2017, Arven Records )
Bana Sevmeyi Anlat ( Soundtrack 2016, Arven Records )
Kara Sevda ( Soundtrack 2016, Arven Records )
Analar ve Anneler ( Soundtrack 2015, Arven Records )
Med Cezir ( Soundtrack 2015, Arven Records )
Beş Kardeş ( Soundtrack 2015, Arven Records )
Son ( Soundtrack 2015, Arven Records )
Kara Para Aşk ( Soundtrack 2015, Arven Records )
Karadayı ( Soundtrack 2015, Arven Records )
Kurt Seyit ve Şura ( Soundtrack 2014, Arven Records )
Fatmagül'ün Suçu Ne ? ( Soundtrack 2014, Arven Records )
 Menekşe ile Halil ( Soundtrack 2014, Arven Records )
 Toygar Işıklı Jenerik Müzikleri ( Soundtrack 2014, Arven Records )
 bi Küçük Eylül meselesi (Soundtrack 2014, Arven Records )
 Mahmut ile Meryem (Soundtrack 2014, Arven Records )
 Ezel  (Soundtrack 2014, Arven Records )
 Kuzey Güney (Soundtrack 2013, Arven Records )
 20 Dakika (Soundtrack 2013, Arven Records )
 Hayat Gibi (Solo Album 2013, Poll Production)
 Aşk-ı Memnu  (Soundtrack 2012, Arven Records )
 Sonunda (Solo Album 2010, Sony Music)
 Dudaktan Kalbe  (Soundtrack 2008, Emi Music)
 Yaprak Dökümü  (Soundtrack 2007, DMC)

References 

Turkish film score composers
Turkish composers
Living people
1974 births
People from Gölcük
Turkish keyboardists
Marmara University alumni
Istanbul Technical University alumni
21st-century Turkish singers
Male film score composers
21st-century Turkish male singers